Eugena Roxas Domingo (born July 23, 1971) is a Filipino actress, comedienne and host. She has performed in lead and supporting roles in various genres of the Philippine film industry. She is popularly known as the "Comedy Star for All Seasons" and was a sidekick of Ai-Ai delas Alas in the Ang Tanging Ina series (20032010), until her very first lead film role in Kimmy Dora in 2009.

Domingo's other notable films include Bahay Kubo (2007) for which she received her first Best Supporting Actress award. Her most successful film to date is the Cinemalaya entry, Ang Babae Sa Septic Tank (2011), which is the highest-grossing independent film in Philippine history. The film was an official entry for various international film festivals in Vancouver, South Korea, Hawaii, Japan, and Italy. The film was also chosen by the Film Academy of the Philippines to represent the Philippines in the Best Foreign Language Film category of the 84th Academy Awards. Domingo achieved "Best Actress" awards, at the Cinemalaya (2011) and 10th Gawad Tanglaw for Films (2012). She also received the "People's Choice Award for Best Actress" at the 6th Asian Film Awards (2012) in Hong Kong and "Best Actress" award at the 3rd Pau International Film Festival in France.

Domingo is the only actress in the Philippine entertainment history to have participated in six films (Working Girls, Here Comes the Bride, Mamarazzi, Petrang Kabayo, RPG: Metanoia, Ang Tanging Ina Mo (Last na 'To!)) produced by eight major Filipino production companies (GMA Films, Regal Films, Unitel Productions, OctoArts Films, Quantum Films, VIVA Films, Ambient Media, and Star Cinema) within a year (in 2010). Domingo holds the record of being the first lead actress in Philippine cinema to star in the most films — seven — in a year. Since 2008, she has been a contract artist of GMA Network, appearing on various comedy shows like Jejemom (2010), drama shows like Ako si Kim Sam Soon (2008), Ang Babaeng Hinugot Sa Aking Tadyang (2008) and First Time (2010). She also hosted Cool Center (2009) and Comedy Bar (2010).

Apart from her television and mainstream appearance, she also headlined theater show in Bona produced by the Philippine Educational Theater Association in 2012. She was nominated as "Best Actress in a Play award" for her role at the International Theater Award and eventually hailed as "Best Actress in Theater role" for Bona at the 25th Aliw Awards.

Life and career

1971-2003: Early life and career beginnings
Domingo was born at 1:00 AM on July 23, 1971 in Malate, Manila to Reynaldo Aguinaldo Domingo and Cecilia Atad Roxas. According to her, she was fond of copying her teachers and other people during her childhood life. She became interested in acting when she witnessed a musical held at the CCP Complex. She studied Theatre Arts at the University of the Philippines Diliman, apprenticing as an actress and production staff under the university's theatre company, Dulaang UP. As a theatre major, she went through selling tickets, inviting students to attend their play, begging professors to require students to watch, ushering the audience in and out of the auditorium, rehearsing all night, and learning from the not-so-conventional styles of the most diva directors. Domingo started her minor acting career through the movie, "Emma Salazar Case" produced by Regal Entertainment in 1991. It was then followed by a biographical movie "Maricris Sioson" in 1993 and as condominium maid in "Sa Ngalan ng Pag-ibig" in 1995. She was launched in television as Dolores in a series, Valiente run by ABS-CBN and GMA Network in 1992 to 1997. In 1998, she appeared in a three films produced by Viva Films, Pagdating Ng Panahon, Ikaw Pa Rin Ang Iibigin and Pusong Mamon. She also appeared on the Book 1 of a GMA Network's series, Kirara, Ano Ang Kulay ng Pag-ibig? in 1999. She had her first hosting role through "D-Day with Ms. Dina Bonnevie" in 1999. But, there was a time, when, out of sheer frustration, she stopped acting for the TV-film cameras because of bit player roles. Domingo went back to school and finished her undergraduate thesis, performing the play 'night, Mother opposite Harlene Bautista. After finishing her degree, she continued to perform in several stage productions. Until a friend, now television director Andoy Ranay, insisted that she give TV acting a second chance. She was immediately cast on ABS-CBN show, Sa Dulo Ng Walang Hanggan in 2002. According to her, "acting for TV was really sweeter the second time around, because i found companions who are, with utmost respect to craft, knowing they also came from theater...". Following that, she was cast as Rowena in a launching television series of now Philippines Queen of Comedy Ai-Ai delas Alas, Ang Tanging Ina produced by ABS-CBN in 2003. In the same year, she reprised her role at the show's movie version produced by Star Cinema. She became famous in television through her role as crazy woman named "Lorelie" in a fantasy series, Marina starring Claudine Barretto. She was also cast in films such as Lastikman and Malikmata.

2004-09: Kimmy Dora and numerous films and awards
Domingo became known as a sidekick of the Philippines' Queen of Comedy, Ai-Ai Delas Alas appearing again on the latter's film, Volta in 2004. The next year, she appeared on three films, as Tacing in Star Cinema's Can This Be Love, VIVA Films' Purita and on a cameo role in Seiko Films' Bikini Open. She was cast as Sister Clara, a nun in an adapted series Kampanerang Kuba and also joined Eula Valdez and Jean Garcia on hosting a reality cooking show, Makuha Ka sa Tikim in 2005. Domingo achieved breakthrough in 2006 starring on six films from different production outfits. She appeared as Tina on a film D' Lucky Ones, and as Dora on You Are The One both produced by Star Cinema. She also had major roles on Regal Films's Kapag Tumibok ang Puso and on the "LRT" episode of her first Metro Manila Film Festival film, Shake, Rattle and Roll 8. She also starred on a horror film, TxT as Aling Kuring. Domingo became an award-winning actress in 2007 winning "Best Supporting Actress" at the 33rd Metro Manila Film Festival through her role in Bahay Kubo: A Pinoy Mano Po! starring the Philippines Diamond Star, Maricel Soriano. She starred on a total of 10 films in 2007, including her Cinemalaya entry "Pisay" and Seiko Films' "Foster Child" which gave Domingo two Best Supporting Actress awards at the 6th Gawad Tanglaw in 2008. She also appeared on comedy films, including her reunion with Ai-Ai Delas Alas in Pasukob and Ang Cute Ng Ina Mo. Some of her films in 2007 also include Apat Dapat, Dapat Apat with three other comedians, Candy Pangilinan, Pokwang and Rufa Mae Quinto. She also appeared on a film by GMA starring Angel Locsin and Richard Gutierrez, The Promise, and on a Paano Kita Iibigin of Regine Velasquez and Piolo Pascual. Domingo also appeared on two series, Palimos ng Pag-Ibig and on a series, Kokey adapted in a film of the same title.

In 2008, Domingo starred on a Cinemalaya Independent Film Festival entry, "100" which awarded her as "Best Supporting Actress", her fourth in span of 2 years.  She also appeared on the Book 2 of Tanging Ina series, an official Metro Manila Film Festival entry subtitled as Ang Tanging Ina N'yong Lahat. Domingo transferred from ABS-CBN to GMA Network in 2008, with I.T.A.L.Y. as her first ever project. She debut as an official GMA Contract Artist through the comedy series, Ako si Kim Sam Soon starring Regine Velasquez, a remake of a Korean series televised also on the same network. She then appeared as Yaya Madel, in the series Ang Babaeng Hinugot Sa Aking Tadyang starring real life couple, Marian Rivera and Dingdong Dantes. Domingo also appeared as Juaning on a Panoramanila Pictures film, Ploning produced by actress, Judy Ann Santos.

In 2009, Domingo appeared on her first ever movie in a lead role produced by Spring Films entitled as Kimmy Dora: Kambal sa Kiyeme, directed by Joyce Bernal and written by Chris Martinez. It tells the story of twin sisters Kimmy and Dora, both played by Domingo who are directly opposite each other in terms of characteristics and styles. Czeriza Valencia of the Philippine Entertainment Portal notes that Domingo served as the funny factor in the film, since her skillful execution in playing the two roles made the situations hilarious. Lito Zulueta of the Philippine Daily Inquirer writes that Domingo's performance "runs the gamut of comic inventiveness" and "confirms her status as the country's funniest comic ingénue". Although starring in her major role, Domingo stated that she is still open for supporting roles. She then appeared on RVQ Production film entitled Nobody, Nobody But... Juan starring the Philippines King of Comedy, Dolphy. In the same year, she appeared on a comedy series Adik Sa'Yo and on her third hosting role, Cool Center together with Allan K. She was also awarded "Bert Marcelo Award" for Comedians at the 2009 Guillermo Mendoza Foundation Awards.
Walang Asawa.

2010-12: Ang Babae sa Septic Tank, international exposure and other films
Domingo reprised her role on the third installment of Tanging Ina, subtitled as Ang Tanging Ina Mo (Last na 'To!) in 2008 wherein she won Best Supporting Actress award at the 36th Metro Manila Film Festival. Her voice, as Mercedes also appeared on the animated film, RPG: Metanoia. She was again starred on her second lead role in Mamarazzi produced by Regal Films and as Paula in GMA Films' Working Girls. Even though she was a contract artist of GMA, she managed to appear on Star Cinema films, Here Comes The Bride and Petrang Kabayo. She is the only actress in the Philippine entertainment history to have participated in six films (Working Girls 2010, Here Comes the Bride, Mamarazzi, Petrang Kabayo, RPG: Metanoia, Ang Tanging Ina Mo (Last na 'To!)) produced by eight Filipino production companies (GMA Films, Regal Films, Unitel Productions, OctoArts Films, Quantum Films, Viva Films, Ambient Media, Star Cinema) within a year. Domingo holds the record of being the first lead actress in Philippine cinema to star in the most films — seven — in a year.

She had her two hosting stints in GMA Network, through Comedy Bar and on a kiddie show, Wachamakulit. She also appeared on her first sitcom, JejeMom, inspired from a text messaging style alias, Jejemon. She made her last appearance on a GMA Network series through her minor role as guidance councillor in a teen-oriented series, First Time. Domingo appeared on TV5 through her comedy show, "Inday Wanda".

2011 marked another successful year for Domingo wherein she starred in 9 local films. She was paired with matinee idol, Richard Gutierrez in "Gunaw" (Apocalypse) episode of a trilogy, My Valentine Girls. She was also cast as Belinda Eduque on Who's That Girl? and as Precy in Wedding Tayo, Wedding Hindi. According to a review from PEP, "She(Domingo) was still able to make the material fresh and entertaining. Her punch lines, although sometimes buried under long dialogues, and antics elicited laughter from viewers...". She also appeared on independent films, Zombadings 1: Patayin Sa Shokot Si Remington produced by Origin8media and Pisay produced by Cinemalaya. Domingo appeared on three films at the 2011 Metro Manila Film Festival through Enteng Ng Ina Mo, Shake, Rattle & Roll 13 and My House Husband: Ikaw Na! wherein she was honored another "Best Supporting Actress" award.

In the same year, she appeared on a critically acclaimed Cinemalaya entry, Ang Babae Sa Septic Tank, holding the record for the highest grossing Filipino independent film in history. The film is an official entry for the 2011 Vancouver International Film Festival, Pusan International Film Festival, Hawaii International Film Festival, Tokyo International Film Festival, and Far East Asian Film Festival in Italy. The film was also chosen by the Film Academy of the Philippines to represent the Philippines in the Best Foreign Language Film category of the 84th Academy Awards.  Through the film, Domingo was awarded as "Best Actress" at the Cinemalaya (2011)  and 10th Gawad Tanglaw for Films (2012).  She was also awarded the "People's Choice Award for Best Actress" at the 6th Asian Film Awards (2012) in Hong Kong wherein she rises humor together with Asian superstar Andy Lau on-stage. Domingo's acceptance speech elicited boisterous laughter from the audience, which includes some of the biggest names in Asian cinema. She was also nominated as Best Actress at the 35th Gawad URIAN Awards and 28th PMPC Star Awards for Movies in 2012. She was also named "Comedienne of the Year" at the Yahoo! OMG Awards. She also received the "Best Actress" award at the 3rd Pau International Film Festival which was held in France. According to a review on Philippine Entertainment Portal, Domingo proves her versatility as an actress.

In 2012, Domingo starred on the poorly acclaimed sequel of Kimmy Dora, subtitled as Kimmy Dora and The Temple of Kiyeme shot in Philippines and South Korea. She also starred on the first ever Filipino musical film entitled, I Do Bidoo Bidoo: Heto nAPO Sila! produced by Unitel in partnership with Studio 5. It is a tribute to APO Hiking Society, and received positive reviews from critics. She also hosted a game show under GMA Network, Celebrity Bluff with comic duo, Jose Manalo and Wally Bayola. Domingo also stars on theater through Bona, produced by the Philippine Educational Theater Association (PETA). She was a call center agent obsessed with actor-wannabe Edgar Allan Guzman.  She was nominated as "Best Actress in a Play award" for her role at the International Theater Award. She was also hailed as "Best Actress" for Bona at the 25th Aliw Awards in 2012. According to Gibz Cadiz of Philippine Daily Inquirer, Domingo is a tremendous actress, her theater background coming to the fore in her command of space, the way she deploys her vocal instrument, her ability to think on her feet (her every adlib is a hit with the audience).

2013-2018: Critically-acclaimed projects
Domingo was featured on another Cinemalaya entry for 2013, entitled as "Instant Mommy", a comedy film about a wardrobe mistress in TV commercials who fakes a pregnancy to keep her Japanese fiancé. The film is written and directed by Leo Abaya,  and another team-up work with Director Chris Martinez as one of the producers, who directs Domingo on the two "Kimmy Dora" (2010 and 2012) movies, "Here Comes The Bride" (2010), "Ang Babae sa Septic Tank" (2011) and "I Do Bidoo Bidoo" (2012). Co-produced by Quantum Films and Kris Aquino, Instant Mommy also stars Japanese actor Yuki Matsuzaki, who was part of the Hollywood films Letters from Iwo Jima and Pirates of the Caribbean: On Stranger Tides. According to Matsuzaki, he was impressed by Domingo's performance in The Woman in the Septic Tank which made him agree to be her leading man.

She worked again with Star Cinema on a film entitled "Tuhog", a black-comedy movie which also stars Jake Cuenca and Enchong Dee and under the direction on Ronnie Velasco, which was originally submitted for the 2012 Metro Manila Film Festival, but failed to make the final cut. She also joined Maricel Soriano, Billy Crawford and Andi Eigenmann on a film, "Momzillas" produced by Viva Films. The film is her second movie with the Diamond Star, Soriano, the first being Bahay Kubo in 2007. Domingo is also set to do a movie with Kris Aquino, written by Chris Martinez and to be directed by Joyce Bernal. On an interview with Manila Bulletin, she revealed that she will be doing her first lead role for MMFF this 2013. On June 18, 2013; MMDA Chairman Francis Tolentino announced the 8 official entries of the year's festival, and the third installment of "Kimmy Dora" film subtitled as The Prequel Kiyeme is one it.

Domingo also replaced Aquino in a film by Jun Lana entitled as Barber's Tales or Kuwentong Barbero. The second installment in Lana's small-town trilogy (the first being Bwakaw (2012)) is about a widow defying gender role expectations in the 1970s by running her late husband's barbershop. The film won four awards at the Hong Kong Asia Film Financing Forum (HAF), which ended on March 20 including the top prize HAF Award, ARRI Award, which allows access to rental of camera and lighting equipment, Technicolor Asia award, which comes with post-production services (from Thailand firm of the same name) and the second Catapooolt award. On her performance, Domingo won as "Best Actress" at the 26th Tokyo International Film Festival in Japan. According to Domingo, the award is a stepping stone of the Filipinos to be recognized in the Asian cinema.

In 2013, Domingo was one of the Dekada awardees at the 10th Golden Screen Awards for Movies for their cumulative trophies on its past awards. Domingo is also set to appear on another Chris Martinez movie, for Regal Films titled as "Status: It's Complicated" with Paulo Avelino, Solenn Heussaff, and Jake Cuenca. It is a reworking project of the classic Ishmael Bernal's comedy "Salawahan".

2019-present: Recent projects
In 2019, Domingo starred in "Ang Babae sa Septic Tank 3: The Real Untold Story of Josephine Bracken", the last installment for the "Ang Babae sa Septic Tank" trilogy. The film was streamed exclusive via iWantTV.In 2020 to 2022 Domingo was in hiatus due to the COVID 19 pandemic. In 2023, she returned to the film industry through an Amazon Prime exclusive mistress-murder-mystery film, Ten Little Mistresses, the first ever Filipino film on the platform. The film was directed by Jun Lana with Pokwang, Carmi Martin, John Arcilla and Agot Isidro as co-actors.Domingo is set to star for Here Comes the Groom, an official entry for the 2023 Metro Manila Summer Film Festival which will be held on April 8, 2023. It is a sequel of the 2010 film, Here Comes the Bride, both directed by Chris Martinez.

Artistry

Influences
Domingo admires Lolita Rodriguez, for the reason she states that, "...when she(Rodriguez) decided to walk away and just be a normal person, it meant that she was already satisfied and that she's made a mark and that she would never be forgotten..." She also cited the Superstar, Nora Aunor as her inspiration, but she admitted she doesn't want to be compared with Aunor who originally showcased Domingo's latest theater role, Bona. She also cited the Philippines Star For All Season, Vilma Santos as one of her idols. She also parodied some of the famous dialogues and looks of Santos in various films such as D' Lucky Ones. Domingo also announced admiration for the Philippine actress, Maricel Soriano who is dubbed as "The Diamond Star". She likes how she handled her career and all the issues being thrown at her and she was impressed by her class and elegance.

Styles
Domingo shows in her projects that her comic touch is still very much apparent as she delivers one-liners that elicit cheers from the appreciative crowd. According to Philippine Entertainment Portal, she gives no exaggeration in her roles, be it as a popular actress or a weary mother. Considering how her past films are, her acting styles just grabbed the audience senseless and ended up picking themselves up after rolling on the floor laughing. Domingo has a wide range of acting skill, from full-on hysterical to completely flat-line dramatic acting. According to her, "...everybody has a gift, some are developed. But the truly gifted are born with it. But they should never take it for granted. Acting workshops can help, but practice and exposure and training constitute the real deal...". She further added that her theater experience has given her the medium for her acting styles. According to GMA News, Domingo brings her signature style to her movies especially on the musical I Do Bidoo Bidoo: Heto nAPO Sila! as a no-nonsense yet loving mother. Also, as the stronger maternal figure, she gets to show it with some of the movie's best lines. Her timing on delivering her long lines also adds to her special aura as a comedian, and often steal spotlights because of her witty lines. Her humorous quips never fail to elicit thunderous laughter from the audience because she plays her character to maximum comedic effect.

Filmography

Television

Movies

Awards and nominations

References

External links
ABS-CBN Interactive, 2007 a banner year for Eugene Domingo
 

1971 births
Living people
People from Malate, Manila
People from Makati
University of the Philippines Diliman alumni
Actresses from Manila
Filipino film actresses
Filipino television actresses
Filipino women comedians
Filipino game show hosts
Filipino stage actresses
Filipino television variety show hosts
GMA Network personalities
ABS-CBN personalities
TV5 (Philippine TV network) personalities